The Trieux is a  river in the Côtes-d'Armor department, Brittany, France, beginning near Kerpert. It empties into the English Channel near Lézardrieux. Other towns along the Trieux are Guingamp and Pontrieux. Its longest tributary is the Leff.

References

Rivers of France
Rivers of Brittany
Rivers of Côtes-d'Armor
2Trieux